Teterow is a town of Germany, in the district of Rostock, in Mecklenburg-Western Pomerania. It is the geographical center of this federal state. It had a population of 8,852 in 2011.

History

The Stadtkirche St. Peter und Paul (St. Peter and St. Paul's Church), was built in 1215 in Late Romanesque and Gothic style.

There are two remaining gates of the ancient city wall: the 14th-century Malchiner Tor (today the seat of the museum of local history), and the Rostocker Tor.

The Marktplatz (Market Square), with the Town Hall, was built in 1910 in Neo-Baroque style.

The "Hechtbrunen" with inscription in "Plattdütsch" (Northgerman dialect). Weck Lüd sünd klauk un weck sünd däsig, un weck dei sünd wat öwernäsig. Lat't ehr spijöken, kinnings lat't, dei Klock hett lürr't, dei Hekt is fat't.

Culture 
Thusch -  - Theater in der Uhrenschule (Theatre at the Clock factory). A Studio theatre and cinema, existing since 2002. Member of the Landesverbandes Filmkommunikation Mecklenburg-Vorpommern, the umbrella organisation of art house cinema and film clubs.

Twin Towns
Teterow is twinned with:

  Bad Segeberg, Germany, since 1990 
  Scheeßel, Germany, since 1990
  Białogard, Poland, since 1993
  Kunszentmárton, Hungary, since 1993
  Šiauliai, Lithuania, since 1999
  Sjöbo, Sweden, since 2008

Famous residents

Ulrich Adam (born 1950) - politician (CDU), member of the German Bundestag from 1990 to 2009, holder of the Federal Cross of Merit
Herta Bothe (born 1921) - Nazi concentration camp guard, war criminal
Marcel Gleffe (born 1979) - "Saviour of Utøya", saved the lives of 20 people during the 2011 Utøya massacre in Norway
Hans G. Helms (1932–2012) - experimental writer, composer, social and economic analyst and critic
Gerd Kische (born 1951) - former German football player
René Lange (born 1988) - German football player
Johann Heinrich von Thünen (1783–1850) - prominent economist, influential in the field of Economic geography

References

External links 
 
 Official website of Teterow

Cities and towns in Mecklenburg
Populated places established in the 13th century
1272 establishments in Europe
Grand Duchy of Mecklenburg-Schwerin